The 2019 Swedish Indoor Athletics Championships was the 54th edition of the national championship in indoor track and field for Sweden. It was held on 16 and 17 February at the Stadium Arena in Norrköping.

The national indoor championship in combined track and field events was held separately on 12 and 13 February at the IFU Arena in Uppsala.

Results

Men

Women

References

Results
Inomhus SM 2019. LiveResults.se. Retrieved 2019-07-07.
ISM Mangkamp alla klasser resultat . UIF Friidrott. Retrieved 2019-07-07.

External links 
 Official website of the Swedish Athletics Association

2019
Swedish Athletics Championships
Swedish Championships
Athletics Championships
Sport in Norrköping